Carlos Eduardo da Corte Imperial (November 24, 1935 – November 4, 1992), better known as Carlos Imperial, was a Brazilian actor, filmmaker, television presenter, songwriter and music producer from Rio de Janeiro, Brazil.

Early life and education
Carlos Eduardo da Corte Imperial was born on November 24, 1935 in Cachoeiro de Itapemirim, ES, Brazil.

Career
In the early 1970s, Imperial became a controversial judge on a talent show presented by Chacrinha. At the end of the decade, he presented TV Tupi as an attraction on Saturday nights and was a show that the country watched religiously; it later migrated to TVS - Canal 11 Rio de Janeiro.

Imperial was also a columnist for the magazine Amiga, published by Bloch Publishing from 1969. His column was characterised by its irreverence. At the 1984 Carnival, Imperial became famous for releasing the notes of the jurors in the parades of the samba schools in Rio. Every time a maximum score was awarded he exclaimed loudly "dez, nota dez" ("ten! ten points!"). This sentence appealed to popular taste, gaining him real support. He was elected an alderman of Rio de Janeiro in 1982. He ran for mayor of Rio in 1985, but lost the election.

He later became an author of the well-known 1960s song "A Praça" ("the square"), the Ronnie Von hit that became the opening theme of the humorous television programme A Praça É Nossa ("the square is ours").

Around 1961, at the age of 29, Imperial tried to launch the career of Roberto Carlos as a "prince of bossa nova", producing his first album, Crazy For You. However, his pupil was accused of shamelessly imitating Joao Gilberto, and the album failed. But he continued until he was signed to CBS in 1958 as a producer. At that time he was known as "Dad".
Imperial also launched the Career of vários Brazilian superstars such as Elis Regina, Erasmo Carlos, Tim Maia, Wilson Simonal and many others. He was known as the father of Rock’n Roll in Brazil and was fundamental in the music, movie, theater, television and politics. His music and art still expanding in Brazil and it’s showcased in documentaries and biographies of several artists life story.

Personal life
Imperial had a daughter Maria Luiza and a son Marco Antonio from his marriage to Rose Gracie, the daughter of Carlos Gracie from the Gracie Family.
Maria Luiza married her second cousin Rorion Gracie and had two daughters that were the love of Imperial’s life as he would always claim named Rose Corte Imperial Gracie 
(named after her grandmother) and Riane Corte Imperial Gracie. 
Rose took care of her grandfather for the last few months of his life and moved to the US soon after Imperial's death and has lived there since then. She has three daughters, Stephanie Milius that is also the granddaughter of John Milius, Railey and Raifa that are from her second marriage to Cuban MMA Fighter Javier Vazquez<. She resides in California, USA.

Riane also moved to the US after living in Europe for a few years and she now lives in Georgia, USA and has one daughter named Raianne.

Marco Antonio got involved with the Santo Daime and has become a prominent figure in that religion. He has 13 kids.

Death
Imperial was a victim of the rare disease myasthenia gravis. After an operation to remove his thymus, he died on November 4, 1992, in Rio de Janeiro, at the age of 56.

Filmography

TV shows
1977: Programa Carlos Imperial
1979: Show Carlos Imperial

Director
1974: A Building Called 200
1975: The Death Squad
1976: Sex Dolls
1976: The sex fiend
1979: Humor, the Golden Butt
1981: Delights of Sex
1981: A Martian in My Bed
1981: Women

Actor

1954: The oil is ours - Bit part
1956: Smuggling
1957: De Vento em Popa
1957: Sherlock Araque - Carlos
1957: cowboy up
1957: Canjerê
1958: My mother and Police
1958: And He Do not Bug - Chicão
1958: Joy of Life
1958: Agüenta o Rojão
1959: Women on Vista
1959: Walking in the Table
1959: Lean Girl
1960: Go That Is Soft - Pé de Cabra
1961: Women, I came
1961: Rio Night
1961: The owner of the Ball - Ronaldo
1962: Blood at Dawn
1964: Asphalt Wild
1968: The King of Pilantragem
1968: Bebel, Garota Propaganda
1969: Time of Violence
1971: The Loves of a Tacky
1971: The Sweet Sex Sports
1972: The Virgin Widow - Coronel Alexandrão
1972: Independence or Death - taberneiro
1972: Cassy Jones, Magnificent Seducer
1973: A building called 200 - Bororó
1973: Pica-Pau Amarelo - Capitão Gancho
1973: The depraved
1974: Sex Dolls
1974: Banana Mechanics - Dr. Ferrão
1975: The Expletive
1975: The Monster Caraíba
1975: The Death Squad
1976: The Pervert
1976: O Palavrão
1976: Girls Want ... And the Crown may
1976: The island of Virgin Cangaceiros
1977: Bad Step
1977: Holiday Loving
1978: O Gigante da América
1978: The Bride of the City
1978: Amada Amante - Godoy
1980: Delights of Sex
1981: Women - Fausto
1985: Lost in Dinosaur Valley - China
1985: The good times roll: Let's Enjoy It Again - (segment "Sábado Quente")
1990: O Escorpião Escarlate

References
 http://www.answers.com/topic/carlos-imperial

External links
 

1935 births
1992 deaths
Brazilian male film actors
Brazilian television presenters
Brazilian songwriters
Brazilian film directors
Brazilian record producers
Brazilian film producers
20th-century Brazilian male actors